The Second Street–Gun River Bridge was a bridge in Martin Township, Michigan, USA. It was demolished in 2012. The bridge was significant as a rare example of a bridge with a plaque stating that it had been built as a result of Michigan's Covert Act. It was also one of the few remaining examples of a camelback highway bridge in Michigan.

History
The bridge was built in 1926 as part of the Covert Act, which required the state, upon request of the appropriate locality, to construct all trunk-line roads.  The Allegan County Road Commission hired the Yost Brothers of Decatur, Indiana, to construct the bridge.  The bridge is believed to have been based on a standard Michigan State Highway Department plan for a curved-chord concrete girder bridge.  It was listed on the National Register of Historic Places in 1999. The bridge was demolished in 2012 as part of a road improvement project.

Description
The Second Street–Gun River Bridge consisted of a single concrete through-girder span, 48 feet in length. The substructure contained concrete abutments with both T-shaped and flared. The bridge's concrete girders had curved tops with six cast window-like recesses. The deck was 29.3 feet wide, with a 22 feet wide roadway covered with blacktop. The corner posts had squared caps and bases, with four curved concrete brackets at the corner of each girder.

See also

References

Road bridges on the National Register of Historic Places in Michigan
Bridges completed in 1926
Transportation in Allegan County, Michigan
1926 establishments in Michigan
National Register of Historic Places in Allegan County, Michigan
Girder bridges in the United States
Concrete bridges in the United States
Buildings and structures in Allegan County, Michigan